Surya Saputra (born 27 December 1967) is an Indonesian wrestler. He competed in the men's freestyle 52 kg at the 1988 Summer Olympics.

References

1967 births
Living people
Indonesian male sport wrestlers
Olympic wrestlers of Indonesia
Wrestlers at the 1988 Summer Olympics
Place of birth missing (living people)